The 2003 Campeonato Brasileiro Série A was the 47th edition of the Campeonato Brasileiro Série A. The first edition with only a double round-robin and no playoffs, it began on March 29, 2003, and reached its end on December 14. The competition was won by Cruzeiro Esporte Clube, who completed a treble.

Format
The 24 teams played against each other twice. At the season finale, the team with the most accumulated points (3 for each win, 1 for a draw, none for a loss) was declared champion. The two worst teams were relegated to the Campeonato Brasileiro Série B of the following year.

Standings

Results

Top scorers

References

External links
 Campeonato Brasileiro Série A 2003 at RSSSF

 

2003 in Brazilian football leagues
2003